Gambissara  is a small town in south-eastern Gambia near the border with Senegal. It is located in Fulladu West District in the Upper River Division.  As of 2009, it has an estimated population of 10,102.

Gambissara Forest Park is located nearby.

References

Populated places in the Gambia